Adama Traoré (born 3 February 1990) is an Ivorian professional footballer who plays for A-League club Western Sydney Wanderers as a left back. Traoré is a dual national, possessing both an Ivorian passport and an Australian passport.

Club career

First steps
Traoré began his career in his native Ivory Coast. He played for Ecole de Football Yéo Martial. He later signed a three-year contract with former A-League club Gold Coast United, after impressing in trial matches. Gold Coast United invited him for a trial after having watched highlights of his performances at the 2007 Toulon Tournament.

In 2010, Traore stated the move to the former A-League club Gold Coast United was a stepping stone in his ambitions of playing club football internationally. Due to Gold Coast United having its A-League license revoked, he had to leave the club.

Melbourne Victory
On 15 March 2012 it was announced that Traore had signed a two-year contract with A-League club Melbourne Victory. Traore made his debut for the Victory in their Round 1 clash with cross-town rivals Melbourne Heart, an encounter which the Victory lost 2–1. On 9 March 2013, Traore suffered a high grade, high ankle ligament rupture which sidelined him for the rest of the 2012–13 season.

After Clive Palmer's club collapsed Adama Traore signed with Melbourne Victory – and stated his desire to play for Australia's national team.

In May 2014, Traoré's contract with Melbourne expired after declining renewals in hopes of pursuit a career in Europe.

The most prestigious award given to a Melbourne Victory player, the Victory Medal, was awarded to Adama Traore at the end of season awards ceremony on 10 May 2014.

Vitória de Guimarães
On 14 June 2014, it was announced that Portuguese club Vitória de Guimarães had signed Traoré on a multi-year deal.

Basel
But after spending just six months in Portugal, Traoré joined FC Basel on 10 January 2015 signing a three and a half year contract. Traore joined Basel's first team for their 2014–15 season under head coach Paulo Sousa. After playing in two test games Traore played his domestic league debut for the club in the away game in the Stadion Wankdorf, in Bern, on 22 February 2015 as Basel were defeated 2–4 by Young Boys. The season 2014–15 was a very successful one for Basel. The championship was won for the sixth time in a row that season and in the 2014–15 Swiss Cup they reached the final, but finished as runners-up, losing 0–3 to FC Sion in the final. Basel entered the Champions League in the group stage and reached the knockout phase. But Basel then lost to Porto in the Round of 16. In the second half of the season Basel played a 31 matches (18 Swiss League fixtures, 3 Swiss Cup, 2 Champions League and 8 test matches). Traoré totaled 17 appearances, 12 League, 2 Cup and 3 in test games.

In the club's 2015–16 season Urs Fischer was appointed as new head coach. Traore scored his first goal for his club in the home game in the St. Jakob-Park on 1 August 2015. It was the second goal of the game as Basel won 3–0 against Sion. Under trainer Fischer Traoré won the league championship at the end of the 2015–16 Super League season and at the end of the 2016–17 Super League season for the third time. For the club this was the eighth title in a row and their 20th championship title in total. They also won the Swiss Cup for the twelfth time, which meant they had won the double for the sixth time in the club's history.

Traoré left the club in August 2017. Between the years 2014 and 2017 he played a total of 95 games for Basel scoring a total of three goals. 59 of these games were in the Swiss Super League, seven in the Swiss Cup, ten in the UEFA competitions (Champions League and Europa League) and 19 were friendly games. He scored one goal in the domestic league, one in the cup and the other was scored during the test games.

Göztepe
He joined Göztepe S.K. on 14 August 14, 2017. In October 2018 he damaged knee ligaments and was ruled out for the rest of the season.

Melbourne Victory
On 12 September 2019, Traoré rejoined Melbourne Victory on a one year contract. He was released on 11 June 2021.

International career
Traoré has had spells with the Ivory Coast U-17, Ivory Coast U-19, and Ivory Coast U-20, playing a total of seven games for his country, scoring only one goal. He has played two games in the CAF-organised 2007 African Youth Championship (versus Congo and The Gambia) which doubled as a qualifier for the 2007 FIFA U-20 World Cup. During the same year, Traoré also participated in the Toulon Tournament and the UEMOA Tournament.

After arriving in Australia, Traoré stated that he would like to play for the Socceroos. However it later became clear that this was impossible as he had represented Ivory Coast at youth level. Under the regulations of FIFA, a player's national allegiance cannot change after they have represented their country of origin at national youth level unless the player held dual nationality upon their original call-up.

Traoré has also previously been selected for the senior national team to play against Senegal. However, having not yet played a game he has not received a full international cap, he turned down the opportunity to play this game as he had the ambition to play for the Socceroos.

Traore was called up by Ivory Coast for the first time on 7 November 2014 for their matches against Sierra Leone and Cameroon but did not play. He was again called up for the match on 6 September 2015 against Sierra Leone in the Adokiye Amiesimaka Stadium, Port Harcourt (Nigeria) for an Africa Cup of Nations qualification game. Traoré made his national team debut in the starting eleven, but was substituted out after he injured himself. The match ended in a goalless draw.

A possibly unique situation occurred in a match in February 2022 in which Traoré played for an Australian invitational XI against a touring FC Barcelona side. Traoré scored for the Australian side, and his namesake Adama Traoré scored for Barcelona.

Career statistics

Club

International

Honours
Basel
 Swiss Super League: 2014–15, 2015–16, 2016–17
 Swiss Cup: 2016–17; runner up: 2014–15
Ivory Coast
 UEMOA Tournament: 2007
Individual
 Melbourne Victory Player of the Season: 2013–14
A-Leagues All Star: 2022

References

External links
Profile on the Swiss Football League homepage
Melbourne Victory profile

Living people
1990 births
People from Bondoukou
Association football fullbacks
Ivorian footballers
Ivory Coast international footballers
Australian soccer players
Australian people of Ivorian descent
Sportspeople of Ivorian descent
ASEC Mimosas players
Gold Coast United FC players
Melbourne Victory FC players
Vitória S.C. players
FC Basel players
Göztepe S.K. footballers
Western Sydney Wanderers FC players
A-League Men players
Primeira Liga players
Swiss Super League players
Süper Lig players
Expatriate footballers in Portugal
Expatriate footballers in Switzerland
Expatriate soccer players in Australia
Ivorian expatriate footballers
2017 Africa Cup of Nations players
Ivorian expatriate sportspeople in Switzerland
Ivorian expatriate sportspeople in Australia
Naturalised soccer players of Australia